Waleed Ziad (born April 9, 1988) is a Jordanian footballer who plays as a defender for Al-Ahli.

References

External links 
 
 jo.gitsport.net

Association football defenders
Al-Ahli SC (Amman) players
Sahab SC players
Al-Hussein SC (Irbid) players
Al-Sareeh SC players
Al-Yarmouk FC (Jordan) players
Shabab Al-Ordon Club players
Jordanian footballers
1988 births
Living people